The 1980 IIHF European U18 Championship was the thirteenth playing of the IIHF European Junior Championships.

Group A
Played in Hradec Králové, Czechoslovakia from April 1–7, 1980.

First round
Group 1

Group 2

Final round
Championship round

Placing round

Norway was relegated to Group B for 1981.

Tournament Awards
Top Scorer: Sergei Yashin  (14 Points)
Top Goalie: Jirí Steklík
Top Defenceman:Peter Andersson
Top Forward: Sergei Yashin

Group B
Played in Jesenice, Yugoslavia from March 4–8, 1980.

First round
Group 1

Group 2

Placing round

Austria was promoted  to Group A, and the Netherlands was relegated to Group C, for 1981.

Group C
Played in Frederikshavn, Denmark from March 29 to April 3, 1980.

Denmark was promoted to Group B for 1981.

References

Complete results

Junior
IIHF European Junior Championship tournament
International ice hockey competitions hosted by Czechoslovakia
International ice hockey competitions hosted by Yugoslavia
Euro
International ice hockey competitions hosted by Denmark
International ice hockey competitions hosted by Slovenia
Sport in Hradec Králové
IIHF European U18 Championship
IIHF European U18 Championship
Euro
Euro
Sport in Frederikshavn
Sport in Jesenice, Jesenice